Bakerville, Illinois may refer to:
Bakerville, Jefferson County, Illinois, an unincorporated community in Jefferson County
Bakerville, Logan County, Illinois, an unincorporated community in Logan County